Sadabad (also Romanized as Sa‘dābād; also known as Sadaua and Sadaveh) is a village in Takab Rural District, in the Central District of Dargaz County, Razavi Khorasan Province, Iran. At the 2006 census, its population was 428, in 138 families.

References 

Populated places in Dargaz County